Jeffrey Alan David Weima (PhD, Wycliffe College, University of Toronto) is an American theologian. He has held the position of Professor of New Testament at Calvin Theological Seminary since 1992.

He was awarded a B.A. (Brock University, 1983), M.Div. (Calvin Theological Seminary, 1986), Th.M. (Calvin Theological Seminary, 1987), Ph.D. (Wycliffe College, University of Toronto, 1992). Weima has concentrated his research and writing on the Pauline letters, particularly 1-2 Thessalonians.

Bibliography
Neglected Endings: The Significance of the Pauline Letter Closings (Sheffield Academic Press, 1994) 
An Annotated Bibliography of 1 and 2 Thessalonians (Brill, 1998) 
1 & 2 Thessalonians in Zondervan illustrated Bible backgrounds commentary (Zondervan 2002) 1 and 2 Thessalonians BECNT (Baker Books, 2014) 
Paul the Ancient Letter Writer. An Introduction to Epistolary Analysis. (Baker Books, 2016).
The Sermons to the Seven Churches of Revelation (Baker Books, 2021)

References

External links
contains Jeffrey A. D. Weima's profile
Jeffrey A. D. Weima's website

20th-century American theologians
Living people
Calvin Theological Seminary faculty
Brock University alumni
Calvin Theological Seminary alumni
University of Toronto alumni
Year of birth missing (living people)